Senator Sparks may refer to:

Dan Sparks (born 1968), Minnesota State Senate
John Sparks (Oklahoma politician) (fl. 1990s–2010s), Oklahoma State Senate
William A. J. Sparks (1828–1904), Illinois State Senate